Harry Richard Thornton (February 4, 1908 – January 13, 1973) was an American football quarterback in the National Football League (NFL). He played for the Philadelphia Eagles in 1933, starting in one game. He played college football at Michigan and Missouri–Rolla.

Early years
Thornton attended Senn High School in Chicago, Illinois.

College career
Thornton played college football at Missouri–Rolla and Michigan.

Professional career
Thornton played for the Philadelphia Eagles in 1933, playing in four games (including one start). In 1932 and 1933 he also played for the then-independent St. Louis Gunners.

Personal
Thornton's son, Dick, played in the Canadian Football League from 1961 to 1972.

References

1908 births
1973 deaths
American football quarterbacks
Michigan Wolverines football players
Missouri S&T Miners football players
Philadelphia Eagles players
Players of American football from Chicago